McArthur Township is one of the seventeen townships of Logan County, Ohio, United States. As of the 2010 census, the population was 2,016.

Geography
Located in the northern part of the county, it borders the following townships:
Richland Township - north
Rushcreek Township - east
Lake Township - southeast
Harrison Township - southwest
Washington Township - west

The village of Huntsville is located in central McArthur Township, and the unincorporated community of Northwood is located in the township's northeast, along the border with Richland Township.

Name and history
McArthur Township was organized in 1823, and was named for Ohio politician Duncan McArthur. It is the only McArthur Township statewide.

Government
The township is governed by a three-member board of trustees, who are elected in November of odd-numbered years to a four-year term beginning on the following January 1. Two are elected in the year after the presidential election and one is elected in the year before it. There is also an elected township fiscal officer, who serves a four-year term beginning on April 1 of the year after the election, which is held in November of the year before the presidential election. Vacancies in the fiscal officership or on the board of trustees are filled by the remaining trustees.

In the elections of November 2011, D. Bruce Tracey without opposition retained the position of township trustee while Constance Hall was elected without opposition to the position of township fiscal officer.

Transportation
Important highways in McArthur Township include U.S. Routes 33 and 68, and State Routes 117, 274, and 638, along with a small part of State Route 366.

References

External links
County website
County & Township Map of Ohio (PDF object)
Detailed Logan County map

Townships in Logan County, Ohio
1823 establishments in Ohio
Populated places established in 1823
Townships in Ohio